Siri Bjerke (19 June 1958 – 11 February 2012) was a Norwegian politician (Labour Party). She was substitute member of the Norwegian legislature between 1997 and 2005, state secretary in the Ministry of Foreign Affairs between 1993 and 1997 and Minister of the Environment between 2000 and 2001 during Stoltenberg's first cabinet. After leaving politics she worked as a director for the Confederation of Norwegian Enterprise (2002–2005) and for Innovation Norway (2005–). She studied psychology at the University of Oslo.

References

Obituary in Dagbladet

1958 births
2012 deaths
Ministers of Climate and the Environment of Norway
Deputy members of the Storting
Labour Party (Norway) politicians
Innovation Norway people
Deaths from cancer in Norway
Women government ministers of Norway
20th-century Norwegian women politicians
20th-century Norwegian politicians
Women members of the Storting